James Bamford, also known by the nickname "BamBam", is a Canadian film & television director, who was the sole "directing producer" of the series Arrow and directed 17 episodes of the series including multiple premieres, season finales, crossovers and the series finale. He started his career in the film and television industry as a stuntman and fight choreographer with his martial arts experience as his entry skill set. He continued on in his career to become a stunt coordinator, 2nd unit director, then director, and directing producer/executive producer.

James Bamford was president and on the executive board of Stunts Canada, an invitation-only organisation for stunt professionals, for three consecutive two-year terms. Stunts Canada is the oldest and largest stunt association in Canada.

Biography
Bamford was born in Victoria, British Columbia, and presently lives and works out of Vancouver, Canada.

Awards, nominations, medals
James Bamford has won two Leo Awards for Stunt Coordination, as well as a nomination in 2010 for Best Stunt Coordination in a Dramatic Series for the Stargate Universe episode "Air". The Leo Awards celebrate excellence in film and television in British Columbia. In 2013, Bamford won the Leo Award for Best Stunt Coordination in a Television Movie for Halo 4: Forward Unto Dawn. In 2016 he, along with colleagues JJ Makaro, Eli Zagoudakis, and Curtis Braconnier, won the Leo Award for Best Stunt Coordination in a Dramatic Series for the Arrow episode, Brotherhood, in which Bamford made his directorial debut. His directing efforts on the Brotherhood episode were also rewarded with a Leo Award nomination for Best Director in a Dramatic Series.

Bamford was a stunt coordinator on the movie Ek Tha Tiger which won Best Action at the Times of India Film Awards in 2013.

While working as a Juvenile Corrections Officer in Victoria, Bamford won a bronze medal for Team Canada for the Karate-Kumite division in the 1991 World Police and Fire Games, in Memphis, USA.

Career
Bamford has been a stunt double for many actors, including Benicio Del Toro, Mickey Rourke and David Duchovny, and worked as a stunt performer and stunt coordinator on TV shows from The X-Files to Arrow, and films including Final Destination, The Chronicles of Riddick and X-Men 2. He is best known for his work on Arrow, and has appeared at many fan conventions in the US, Canada, the UK and Australia including San Diego Comic-Con.

James Bamford appeared as a subject in the 2014 Vancouver Creatives exhibition by Vancouver Biennale (VnB), comprising portraits of 22 creative Vancouverites  and sponsored by the magazine Vancouver is Awesome. The photographs were an example of collaborative Calotype photography and James Bamford was selected as a result of a public vote.

Interviews

In 2020, James Bamford was a guest on the Positive Solace podcast with BBC journalist Attika Choudhary 

In 2018, Canada's The Globe and Mail profiled James Bamford.

Joseph Mallozzi, producer of Stargate SG-1 and Stargate Atlantis, hosted a Q&A to Bamford on his Wordpress blog in 2008, and called him "the fearless one".

Premiere Scene interviewed Bamford about stunt coordination at the London Film and Comic Con.

Bamford was a presenter at the Leo Awards in 2012.

Next Level Radio interviewed James Bamford, where he says that "a stunt performer has a 100% likelihood of being injured."

DC Entertainment's DC All Access went behind the scenes on the TV show Arrow in April 2014, where James Bamford demonstrates some stunt action.

Bamford was the fight coordinator on the Arrow stunt team, which was hailed by Entertainment Weekly as the Most Likely to Earn Someone an Emmy in their 5th Annual Season Finale Awards, 2014.

Filmography
This is only a small selection of James Bamford's roles, as in June 2014 he had 424 entries at IMDB.

References

External links
 Visited 29 June 2014.
 from Stunts Canada. Visited 29 June 2014.
James Bamford Director Official website. Visited 16 August 2020.

1967 births
Living people
Canadian male film actors
Canadian male television actors
Canadian stunt performers
Canadian television directors
Stunt doubles